Crepidodera digna is a species of flea beetle from the Chrysomelidae family that is endemic to Ontario, Canada.

References

Beetles described in 1986
Beetles of North America
Endemic fauna of Ontario
Alticini